Walid Azaro (born 11 June 1995) is a Moroccan professional footballer who plays as a striker for Ajman and the Moroccan national team.

After beginning his career in his home country, he joined Al Ahly in 2017 and finished as the Egyptian Premier League's top goalscorer in his first season. He made his international debut for Morocco in 2017.

Club career

Azaro was born in Aït Melloul. He started his career with Adrar Souss in the third division of the Moroccan league. He joined Difaâ Hassani El Jadidi in 2015, signing for them on a three-year contract. During the 2016–17 season, he finished as the club's top goalscorer with twelve league goals.

In June 2017, Azaro turned down several offers from European clubs to join Egyptian Premier League club Al Ahly on a four-year deal for a fee of $1.4 million, despite Moroccan national team manager Hervé Renard attempting to convince him to move to Europe. His transfer saw him become the first Moroccan to play for the club.

In his first season with the club, Azaro scored 18 league goals to finish as the top goalscorer in the Egyptian Premier League and help Al-Ahly win their 40th league title. His tally saw him break the record for the most goals scored by a foreign player in the Egyptian Premier League, surpassing the previous record of 17 jointly held by Flávio Amado and John Utaka. He also surpassed Stanley Ohawuchi's record for the most goals scored in the Egyptian Premier League by a player in their first season. He also scored the only goal of the 2017 Egyptian Super Cup and scored a hat-trick against Tunisian side Étoile Sportive du Sahel in the semi-final of the 2017 CAF Champions League. His performances attracted attention from several clubs and Al Ahly rejected an offer from Saudi club Al-Nassr of William Jebor plus a cash sum.

In October 2020, Azaro agreed to join Saudi club Al-Ettifaq on a permanent deal for two years, after being on loan since January. On 30 January 2022, Azaro was released by Al-Ettifaq.

International career
Azaro made his debut for Morocco on 24 March 2017 as a substitute during a 2–0 victory over Burkina Faso. He was named in Morocco's preliminary squad for the 2018 FIFA World Cup but was later omitted from the final squad.

Honours

Club
Al Ahly
 Egyptian Premier League: 2017–18, 2018–19, 2019–20
 Egypt Cup: 2016–17
 Egyptian Super Cup: 2018
African Champions League runner-up: 2017, 2018

Individual
 Egyptian Premier League top goalscorer: 2017–18

References

1995 births
Living people
Moroccan footballers
Morocco international footballers
Difaâ Hassani El Jadidi players
Al Ahly SC players
Ettifaq FC players
Ajman Club players
Botola players
Egyptian Premier League players
Saudi Professional League players
UAE Pro League players
Moroccan expatriate footballers
Expatriate footballers in Egypt
Expatriate footballers in Saudi Arabia
Expatriate footballers in the United Arab Emirates
Moroccan expatriate sportspeople in Egypt
Moroccan expatriate sportspeople in Saudi Arabia
Moroccan expatriate sportspeople in the United Arab Emirates
People from Souss-Massa
Association football forwards
Shilha people